Forbidden Kingdom may refer to:

 The Forbidden Kingdom, a 2008 martial arts film starring Jackie Chan and Jet Li
 The Forbidden Kingdom (soundtrack), a soundtrack album from the film
 Viy (2014 film) or Forbidden Kingdom, a Russian dark fantasy film starring Jason Flemyng
 Forbidden Kingdoms, a setting in Dungeons & Dragons
 Forbidden Kingdom, an area at Chessington World of Adventures theme park in London
 Het verboden rijk (lit. The Forbidden Kingdom), a 1932 novel by J. Slauerhoff
 Bhutan, a country sometimes referred to as the Forbidden Kingdom

See also
 Forbidden City (disambiguation)